The Deputy Speaker of the Tripura Legislative Assembly is subordinate to the speaker of the Legislative Assembly of Tripura. They are responsible for the Legislative Assembly of Tripura and the second highest ranking legislative officer of the Tripura Legislative Assembly. They act as the presiding officer in case of leave or absence caused by death or illness of the Speaker of the Tripura Legislative Assembly. The deputy speaker is chosen from sitting members of the Tripura Legislative Assembly.  The deputy speaker can be removed from office by a resolution passed in the assembly by an effective majority of its members.

List of the Deputy Speakers of Tripura

References

Government of Tripura
Tripura-related lists